Eupithecia sierrae is a moth in the family Geometridae first described by George Duryea Hulst in 1896. It is found in North America, including Colorado, Wyoming, southern Utah, New Mexico, Arizona and California.

The wingspan is about 20 mm.

References

Moths described in 1896
sierrae
Moths of North America